The enzyme 2-dehydro-3-deoxyglucarate aldolase catalyzes the chemical reaction

2-dehydro-3-deoxy-D-glucarate  pyruvate + tartronate semialdehyde

This enzyme belongs to the family of lyases, specifically the aldehyde-lyases, which cleave carbon-carbon bonds.  The systematic name of this enzyme class is 2-dehydro-3-deoxy-D-glucarate tartronate-semialdehyde-lyase (pyruvate-forming). Other names in common use include 2-keto-3-deoxyglucarate aldolase, alpha-keto-beta-deoxy-D-glucarate aldolase, and 2-dehydro-3-deoxy-D-glucarate tartronate-semialdehyde-lyase.  This enzyme participates in ascorbate and aldarate metabolism.

Structural studies

References

 

EC 4.1.2
Enzymes of known structure